Dmytro Prudnikov is a Ukrainian track and field athlete. He won the bronze medal in the men's long jump T20 event at the 2016 Summer Paralympics.

Career 

At the 2013 IPC Athletics World Championships he won the gold medal in the men's long jump T20 event.

At the 2014 IPC Athletics European Championships he won the bronze medal in the men's long jump T20 event.

At the 2015 IPC Athletics World Championships he won the bronze medal in the men's long jump T20 event.

At the 2017 World Para Athletics Championships he won the bronze medal in the men's long jump T20 event and the gold medal in the men's triple jump T20 event.

At the 2018 World Para Athletics European Championships he won the silver medal in the men's long jump T20 event.

References 

Living people
Year of birth missing (living people)
Place of birth missing (living people)
Paralympic athletes of Ukraine
Athletes (track and field) at the 2016 Summer Paralympics
Medalists at the 2016 Summer Paralympics
Paralympic bronze medalists for Ukraine
Paralympic medalists in athletics (track and field)
World Para Athletics Championships winners
Ukrainian male long jumpers